Can't Look Away is the fourth studio album by the singer-songwriter and musician Trevor Rabin, released on 10 July 1989 by Elektra Records. The album reached No. 111 on the U.S. Billboard 200 during a stay of ten weeks. "Something to Hold on To" was released as a single and reached No. 3 on Billboard'''s Mainstream Rock chart, with its accompanying music video receiving a nomination for Best Video, Short Form at the 1990 Grammy Awards. In a 2004 interview, Rabin described Can't Look Away as "by far my best solo album and the one I'm happiest with". The album was reissued in 2011 by Voiceprint Records.

Critical reception

Vik Iyengar of AllMusic gave Can't Look Away'' three stars out of five. He praised it for having "a great sense of melody and layered guitars to create an arena rock sound", while also remarking that "Although the album loses a bit of steam in the second half, the first half includes great pop/rock tunes. ... Fans of latter-day Yes should definitely check out this album".

Track listing

Personnel

Trevor Rabin – lead vocals, guitar, guitar synthesizer, keyboard, bass, backing vocals (tracks 2, 3, 5, 7–9), engineering, production
Lou Molino III – drums (tracks 1–3, 8, 10)
Alan White – drums (tracks 4, 11)
Denny Fongheiser – drums (track 7)
"Basil" – drum machine (tracks 4, 5, 9, 11)
Duncan Faure – backing vocals (tracks 2, 3, 5, 7–9)
Tsidii Le Loka – backing vocals (tracks 3–5, 7)
Beulah Hashe – backing vocals (tracks 3–5, 7)
Faith Kekana – backing vocals (tracks 3–5, 7)
Marilyn Nokwe – backing vocals (tracks 3–5, 7)

Technical

Bob Ezrin – backing vocals (tracks 3, 7), engineering, production
Stan Katayama – engineering
Rick Butz – engineering
Julian Stoll – engineering
Dave Subkleve – engineering
Julie Last – engineering
Tom Banghart – engineering
Ringo Hrycyna – engineering

Chart performance

Album

Singles

Awards

Notes

References

Trevor Rabin albums
1989 albums
Elektra Records albums
Albums produced by Trevor Rabin
Albums produced by Bob Ezrin